Sierra de Perijá National Park, also known as Perijá National Park, is a protected area in Venezuela. It is located in the Serranía de Perijá mountains on the border with Colombia, to the southwest of Zulia state and Lake Maracaibo. The park was established in 1978 with the objective of protecting the hilly regions.

Geography
 
Sierra de Perijá National Park is situated in the Perija and Colon municipalities of Zulia State. The park is accessible by road from Maracaibo.

The park includes a portion of the Serranía de Perijá mountains, which rises above the southwestern area of Lake Maracaibo, a large brackish bay connected to the Gulf of Venezuela.

Flora and fauna

The vegetation in the park consists mainly of rainforest, cloud forests, highland moors and sub-alpine and alpine tundra. Some typical trees include Anacardium excelsum, wax palms Ceroxylon, Cecropia, Gyranthera caribensis, Tabebuia chrysantha, T. billbergii, T. chrysea and Podocarpus oleifolius and there are many herbs, flowering plants and bromeliads.
 
The wildlife in the park includes spectacled bear, as well as capuchin and howler monkeys. Dolphins in Lake Maracaibo are proposed to be brought under a protection programme through the South American River Dolphin Protected Area Network.

Birds may include parrot species such as the endangered military macaw (Ara militaris). An endangered bird species found in the park is the Perija metaltail hummingbird (Metallura iracunda). It is also the habitat for another hummingbird, Coeligena consita, an endemic species of the Sierra de Perijá found on its southern slopes. A newly discovered species of tapaculo found in the park is the Perijá tapaculo (Scytalopus perijanus) which was first described in 2015.

Threats
Uncontrolled fires and deforestation are major threats to the natural ecosystems in the park.

References

Bibliography

External links

National parks of Venezuela
Protected areas established in 1978
Geography of Zulia
1978 establishments in Venezuela
Tourist attractions in Zulia